Upton Coombe is a 7.4 hectare biological Site of Special Scientific Interest near the village of Hawkesbury Upton, South Gloucestershire, notified in 1989.

Sources

 English Nature citation sheet for the site  (accessed 17 July 2006)

Sites of Special Scientific Interest in Avon
South Gloucestershire District
Sites of Special Scientific Interest notified in 1989
Valleys of Gloucestershire